Zornia glabra is a herb species found in South America and native to French Guiana, Guyana, Suriname and Brazil.

It is well adapted to poor soils with low pH levels.

References

glabra